Norman Johnson  was an Anglican priest in the second half of the 19th century.

He was born in 1804 at Newry and educated at Trinity College, Dublin. Ordained in 1833, he was  the incumbent at Kirkcaldy from 1840; Domestic Chaplain to the Countess of Rothes from 1859 and  Dean of  St Andrews, Dunkeld and Dunblane from 1880. He died on 18 September 1890.

References

1804 births
Alumni of Trinity College Dublin
Deans of St Andrews, Dunkeld and Dunblane
1890 deaths